The 1984 United Jersey Bank Classic was a women's tennis tournament played on outdoor hard courts in Mahwah, New Jersey in the [United States that was part of the 1984 Virginia Slims World Championship Series. The tournament was held from August 13 through August 19, 1984. First-seeded Martina Navratilova won the singles title.

Finals

Singles
 Martina Navratilova defeated  Pam Shriver 6–4, 4–6, 7–5
 It was Navratilova's 9th singles title of the year and the 95th of her career.

Doubles
 Martina Navratilova /  Pam Shriver defeated  Jo Durie /  Ann Kiyomura 7–6, 3–6, 6–2
 It was Navratilova's 15th title of the year and the 194th of her career. It was Shriver's 10th title of the year and the 58th of her career.

References

External links
 ITF tournament edition details

United Jersey Bank Classic
WTA New Jersey
United Jersey Bank Classic
United Jersey Bank Classic
United Jersey Bank Classic